FFC Heike Rheine was a German women's football club based in Rheine, North Rhine-Westphalia. Heike Rheine was the first independent women's football club in Germany.

History
The club has its origins at the VfB Rheine. They had played on a local level until 1986 when Alfred Werner took over the head of the women's section. Two consecutive promotions in 1988 and 1989 took the club to the Regionalliga (West), then Germany's top football league for women. A second place in their first season 1989–90 qualified Heike Rheine for the newly founded Bundesliga. In 1992 and 1993 they finished 3rd in their group of the league and reached the semifinals of the cup. In 1994 VfB Rheine merged with SG Eintracht Rheine, naming itself FC Eintracht Rheine. The following years Rheine repeatedly finished 4th in the league thus qualifying for the single-division Bundesliga at its introduction in 1997 while being runner-up in the cup the same year.

On 10 March 1998, the women's section split from the club, becoming independent under the name FFC Heike Rheine. The club was relegated the same year, but managed re-promotion in the following year. In 2004 the club had its greatest success, finishing 3rd in the league and providing the league's top scorer Kerstin Garefrekes. At the end of the season Garefrekes left for 1. FFC Frankfurt. When other top players had left the club in the following years, Rheine was relegated to the 2. Bundesliga in 2007. The relegation triggered the leaving of further core players, leading to a second consecutive relegation in 2008. Rheine continued its decline, and after playing below the top two leagues for eight seasons the club dissolved on 30 September 2016.

Former players

Statistics

 
Defunct women's football clubs in Germany
Defunct football clubs in North Rhine-Westphalia
Association football clubs established in 1998
Association football clubs disestablished in 2016
1998 establishments in Germany
2016 disestablishments in Germany
Women's football clubs in Germany
Frauen-Bundesliga clubs